Bilal Yousif (Arabic:بلال يوسف) (born 25 May 1995) is an Emirati footballer who plays as a midfielder for Ajman.

References

External links
 

Emirati footballers
1995 births
Living people
BSV Schwarz-Weiß Rehden players
Rot Weiss Ahlen players
Sharjah FC players
Al Hamriyah Club players
Fujairah FC players
Ajman Club players
Regionalliga players
UAE Pro League players
UAE First Division League players
Association football midfielders